Impromidine (INN) is a highly potent and specific histamine H2 receptor agonist.

It has been used diagnostically as a gastric secretion indicator.

See also 
 Histamine agonists

References

Imidazoles
Guanidines
Thioethers